Universal opportunity is an aspect of Christian theology.

Under the fate of the unlearned debate, Universal Opportunity (or God Does All He Can Do) is the exclusivist view.

Two vital points specify universal opportunity: 
 God is all-powerful and does not require man's intercession, but chooses to use them when He wills.
 The Bible teaches that God takes no pleasure in the death of the wicked, but instead desires that all men turn from their evil ways and be saved.  If a person is open to believing in Christ, then God will find a way to make an opportunity for salvation available, through whatever means necessary.

The means theorized by Universal Opportunity are often supernatural, such as God sending an angel or a dream or even appearing in person, though this by no means excludes divinely arranging human evangelists coming on the scene. Biblical examples include the Ethiopian eunuch (divinely arranged evangelist) and Cornelius the Centurion (angel) in Acts 8 and 10, respectively.

See also
Fate of the unlearned
Future probation
Invincible error
Vincible ignorance
Willful blindness

References

Christian soteriology